Sir Richard Sandford, 3rd Baronet (8 September 1675 – 2 April 1723) was an English landowner and Whig politician who sat in the English House of Commons between 1695  and 1707, and in the British House of Commons from  1708 to 1723.

Early life

Sandford was the only son of Sir Richard Sandford, 2nd Baronet, of Howgill Castle, Westmorland and his wife Mary Bowes, daughter of Sir Francis Bowes of Thornton, County Durham. His father was murdered in the White Friars, London on the day, and even - it was said - the hour, of his son's birth. His attackers  Henry Symbal and William Jones  were executed shortly after. He entered Christ's College, Cambridge in 1692.

Political career
Sandford was chosen by Sir John Lowther, 2nd Baronet, as his partner for Westmorland at the 1695 general election although under age, and was returned as Member of Parliament (MP)  unopposed. He was returned unopposed again at Westmorland in 1698. He was selected as Mayor of Appleby for the year 1700 to 1701. There was a contest at Westmorland in January 1701 at which he was defeated. He was elected MP for Westmorland again in December 1701 but was defeated there at the 1702 general election. He turned to  Morpeth again in 1705 and was returned there unopposed at the 1705 general election  and in  1708 and 1710. At the 1713 general election he was  elected in contest as MP for Appleby. He was appointed Warden of the Mint in 1714 and held the post until 1717.

Sandford was returned unopposed for Appleby in the 1715 and 1722 general elections.

Death and legacy
Sandford died unmarried on 2 April 1723 at the age aged 47 and the baronetcy became extinct on his death. His estates passed to his sister, the wife of Philip Honywood.

References

 
 
 
 

 
 

1675 births
1723 deaths
18th-century English politicians
English MPs 1695–1698
English MPs 1698–1700
English MPs 1701
English MPs 1701–1702
English MPs 1705–1707
British MPs 1707–1708
British MPs 1708–1710
British MPs 1710–1713
British MPs 1713–1715
British MPs 1715–1722
British MPs 1722–1727
Members of the Parliament of Great Britain for English constituencies
Baronets in the Baronetage of England